Pasadena College is the former name of Point Loma Nazarene University

It may also refer to:

 Pasadena City College
 The fictional institution referred to in I'll Be Home for Christmas